Sepsina tetradactyla, the four-fingered skink, is a species of lizard which is found in Tanzania, Malawi, Zambia, and Democratic Republic of the Congo.

References

tetradactyla
Reptiles described in 1874
Taxa named by Wilhelm Peters